Dora Altmann (born Dora Tremmel, 6 February 1881 – 24 December 1971) was a German actress, who was noted for her decade long career in later life, from the age of 80, starting in 1961 appearing in television series and having a small uncredited appearance in the film Willy Wonka and the Chocolate Factory.

Biography
 
Dora Altmann was born on 20 February 1881 to Munich magistrate Theodor Tremmel. She graduated from the Riemerschmid Commercial School and initially pursued a civil profession. In 1908, without the knowledge of her parents, she joined the Paul Kister folk singer society, which played in the Gärtnerbräu on Reichenbachstrasse. In 1915 she went on tour with her husband Richard Altmann and his music quartet Buntes Münchner Brettl.

In 1947 she was brought to the Platzl by Michl Lang, where she gave the nasty old woman for 24 years until her death. Here she also helped Bally Prell in October 1953 before her premiere as the Beauty Queen of Schneizlreuth with a ribbon from her bodice to fasten the crown on the debutante's head.
 
She made her television debut at the age of 80 in 1961 as Veronika in Die drei Eisbären. In 1971 she  was cast in the uncredited role of Grandma Georgina in Willy Wonka & the Chocolate Factory. Her last television role was as Ms. Windegger in the Tatort episode "Wenn Steine sprechen," broadcast in 1972.
 
In February 1971, she celebrated her 90th birthday with friends from Platzl and died in December 1971 aged 90 and was buried in a cemetery in Munich East. Bally Prell sang at the memorial service.

Selected filmography

External links

1881 births
1971 deaths
Actors from Dresden
People from the Kingdom of Saxony
German film actresses
German television actresses
20th-century German actresses